Brendan Evans and Scott Oudsema won in the final 4–6, 6–1, 6–2, against Andreas Beck and Sebastian Rieschick.

Seeds

Draw

Finals

Top half

Bottom half

References

Boys' Doubles
US Open, 2004 Boys' Doubles